Karl Rudolf Heinze (22 July 1865 – 26 May 1928) was a German jurist and politician. During the Weimar Republic, as a member of the right-of-centre German People's Party (DVP) he was vice-chancellor of Germany and minister of Justice in 1920/21 in the cabinet of Konstantin Fehrenbach and from 1922 to 1923 again minister of Justice under Wilhelm Cuno.

Early life
Karl Rudolf Heinze was born on 22 July 1865 in Oldenburg in what was then the Grand Duchy of Oldenburg as the son of Max Heinze, a professor of the history of philosophy. He attended the Gymnasium in Basel and Leipzig from 1874 to 1881. Following the Abitur he studied at Tübingen, Heidelberg, Berlin and Leipzig, where he was awarded the doctor juris in 1887. After voluntarily serving for one year in the military in 1888, Heinze worked from 1898 to 1912 in the judicial service of Saxony, at the end in the position of Landgerichtsdirektor. In 1914, he became a Reichsgerichtsrat.

In 1900, Heinze married Anna (1863-1948) née Hotop. They had three sons and a daughter.

Political career

Empire
Heinze began his political career in 1899, when he became a Stadtverordneter (member of the city council) at Leipzig. From 1903 he was an unsalaried Stadtrat (member of the city government) in Dresden. From 1907 to 1912, he held a seat in the Reichstag for the National Liberal Party where he was a member of the party's right wing. In 1915-16, Heinze was a member of the Landtag (diet) of the Kingdom of Saxony. On account of personal contacts to Turkey, Heinze then was appointed Undersecretary of State at the Ministry of Justice of the Ottoman Empire in Constantinople. He remained there until the summer of 1918.

From July to November 1918, Heinze was Minister of Justice of the Kingdom of Saxony and briefly the last Ministerpräsident of the King of Saxony.

Weimar Republic
In the German Revolution of 1918-19 Heinze was instrumental in founding the Deutsche Volkspartei (DVP). He was a leading member of the DVP first in the Weimar National Assembly (1919/20) and then of the Reichstag (1920–24).

In June 1919, Heinze played a key role in making possible a compromise between the opposition and the government on the Treaty of Versailles, paving the way to its acceptance by the National Assembly.

In June 1920, he tried unsuccessfully to form a new government, after the Reichstag elections had caused the resignation of the previous government of Hermann Müller. However, the Social Democratic Party of Germany (SPD) refused to work with the DVP, whose foreign policy stance the Social Democrats considered too nationalistic. When Konstantin Fehrenbach became Chancellor, Heinze became Vice-Chancellor and Minister of Justice in his cabinet. The Fehrenbach cabinet resigned in May 1921.

From November 1922 to August 1923, Heinze was once again Vice-Chancellor and Minister of Justice in the cabinet of Wilhelm Cuno. Heinze organized supplies for the population of the Ruhr area during the occupation by French and Belgian troops. The passive resistance against the occupiers resulted in economic collapse and hyper inflation in Germany, leading to the resignation of the Cuno cabinet in August 1923.

In October 1923, the Ministerpräsident of the Free State of Saxony, Erich Zeigner refused to disband the Proletarische Hundertschaften (an armed militia of communist workers) and to dismiss the communist members of his cabinet. Reichswehrminister Otto Gessler ordered the Reichswehr into Saxony and on 28. October president Friedrich Ebert, making use of Article 48 of the Weimar Constitution dismissed Zeigner. Chancellor Gustav Stresemann (DVP) appointed Heinze Reichskommissar, effectively Zeigner's successor. Heinze attempted to install a bourgeois government but was forestalled by the Saxony diet, which on 31 October elected Alfred Fellisch (SPD) as Ministerpräsident and head of a social-democratic cabinet.

From 1924 to 1926, Heinze lived secludedly in Dresden. In 1926/27, on the suggestion of the Turkish government, Heinze chaired the Konsularobergericht  (a disciplinary court for the foreign service) in Egypt. He died on 26 May 1928 in Dresden.

References

1865 births
1928 deaths
People from Oldenburg (city)
People from the Grand Duchy of Oldenburg
German Lutherans
National Liberal Party (Germany) politicians
German People's Party politicians
Government ministers of Germany
Vice-Chancellors of Germany
Members of the 12th Reichstag of the German Empire
Members of the Weimar National Assembly
Members of the Reichstag of the Weimar Republic
Ministers-President of Saxony
Members of the Second Chamber of the Diet of the Kingdom of Saxony
Heidelberg University alumni